Laurence Edmund Allen was an American journalist for the Associated Press from 1933 to 1961. He won the first Pulitzer Prize for Telegraphic Reporting in 1942 for his coverage of the British Mediterranean Fleet.

Biography
Laurence Edmund Allen was born in Mt. Savage, Maryland. He began his journalistic career on the local bureau of the Baltimore News in 1926. He subsequently moved to West Virginia and joined the Daily Mail in Charleston, where he worked as a reporter and a telegraph editor for six years. In 1933 he was hired by the Associated Press's local bureau, where he worked as a local reporter and a site editor. After two years, he was transferred to Washington, another two years after — to New York, where he became a foreign cables deskman till 1937.

From 1938 to 1944, Allen served as a European war correspondent for the Associated Press. During his assignment covering the British Mediterranean Fleet, he took part as a journalist in the Battle of Crete and the Tobruk's raid. Allen survived eight torpedo attacks and was held in a Nazi prison camp for eight months. In 1942, the journalist was awarded the Pulitzer Prize for Telegraphic Reporting and the National Headliner Club Award for his combat correspondence during World War II. In 1945, Allen was also awarded the Bronze Star for the Defending Freedom Press as Prisoner of War, in 1947 — the Order of the British Empire by King George VI.

In 1945, Allen covered the Communist takeover of Poland. He then moved to Moscow, where he headed the Associated Press news bureau. Allen held the same position in Tel Aviv in 1950, and then he was assigned to Singapore, Vietnam, Thailand, and also Indochina, where he covered the battle of Dien Bien Phu during the First Indochina War. In 1957, Allen shifted his focus to the Fidel Castro takeover in Cuba, but four years later he was retired.

References

Books

1908 births
1983 deaths
Pulitzer Prize for International Reporting winners
Associated Press people
People from Mount Savage, Maryland
20th-century American journalists
American male journalists
People from Charleston, West Virginia